Ooni Osinkola was the 18th Ooni of Ife, a paramount traditional ruler of Ile Ife, the ancestral home of the Yorubas. He succeeded Ooni Adegbalu and was succeeded by  
Ooni Ogboruu.

References

Oonis of Ife
Yoruba history